Joachim Prinz (May 10, 1902 – September 30, 1988) was a German-American rabbi who was an outspoken activist against Nazism in Germany in the 1930s and later became a leader in the Civil Rights Movement in the United States in the 1960s.

As a young rabbi in Berlin, he urged Jews in Germany to leave the county amidst the rise of the Nazi Party. The Nazi government expelled Prinz in 1937, and he settled in the United States. In his adopted country, he continued his advocacy for European Jews as a leader in the World Zionist Organization. He saw common cause between the fight against Nazism with the drive for civil rights in America and was one of the founding chairmen of the 1963 March on Washington. During the program, Prinz spoke immediately before Martin Luther King Jr. delivered his iconic "I Have a Dream speech".

Early life
Prinz was born to a Jewish family in 1902 in the village of Burkhardtsdorf in the state of Saxony of the German Empire. His father was a successful merchant. His mother, with whom Prinz was very close and who he came to associate his Jewish identity with, died when he was almost 13 years old.

Prinz's family had been in Germany for 300 years and like most German Jews, were assimilated into German culture. However, Prinz felt that the German people did not perceive the Jews as German, and much to the chagrin of his father, became an ardent Zionist, joining the Blau-Weiss (Blue-White) Zionist youth movement in Germany.

He attended the University of Berlin, then received his Ph.D. in Philosophy, with a minor in Art History, from the University of Giessen. He was ordained as a rabbi at the Jewish Theological Seminary in Breslau in 1925.

Prinz assumed a rabbinate in Berlin in 1927. From the pulpit, he spoke out against the rising Nazi movement. After the Nazi Party assumed power in 1933 and Adolf Hitler became Chancellor of Germany, Prinz urged the Jews of Germany to immediately migrate to Mandatory Palestine. He then left his synagogue to advocate against the Hitler regime throughout Germany.

After repeated arrests by the Gestapo, Nazi Germany's secret police, Prinz was expelled by the Nazi government in 1937. He was invited by Rabbi Stephen Wise of the Free Synagogue in New York and a close adviser to President Franklin Roosevelt, to settle in America.

On his last night in Berlin, Prinz delivered a farewell sermon that was attended by thousands of people, including Nazis who would regularly attend Prinz's sermons to monitor what he was saying. Also in the audience was Adolf Eichmann, one of the architects of the [{Holocaust]].

Immigration to America
He immediately began lecturing throughout the U.S. for the United Palestine Appeal, established in the 1920s as the fund raising arm in the United States for the Jewish Agency for Israel. It was, essentially, the precursor to what became the American Jewish support base for a nation state of Israel and the United Israel Appeal.

Upon arrival to the United States, Prinz settled in New Jersey and became rabbi of Temple B'Nai Abraham in Newark. He served as the congregation's rabbi from 1939 to 1977.

Activism

Zionist activism and advocacy for world Jewry
Prinz became a leader in American Jewish communal and advocacy organizations. From 1958 to 1966, he was president of the American Jewish Congress (AJC)Within a short period, Prinz's activism helped him rise to become one of the top leaders within the Jewish organizational structure. He held top leadership positions in the World Jewish Congress, as president of the American Jewish Congress from 1958–1966, and as Chairman of the World Conference of Jewish Organizations. Later, he was a director of the Conference of Jewish Material Claims Against Germany.

Prinz's early involvement in the Zionist movement made him a close ally and friend of the founding leaders of the State of Israel. Prinz was essential to establishing what became the Conference of Presidents of Major American Jewish Organizations. Prinz was Chairman from 1965-1967.

Involvement in the Civil Rights Movement
Because of his experience in Germany, Prinz identified with the cause of the African-Americans in the United States, seeing parallels between their plight and that of German Jews under Hitler.
Before his permanent settlement, Prinz visited America on an exploratory visit in 1937. Upon his return to Germany, he wrote of his impressions for the German-Jewish literary magazine Der Morgen:

From his early days in Newark, a city with a very large minority community, he spoke from his pulpit about the disgrace of discrimination. He joined the picket lines across America protesting racial prejudice  from unequal employment to segregated schools, housing and all other areas of life.

As a rabbi, Prinz used his pulpit to involve his congregants in the civil rights movement. Prinz met civil rights leader Martin Luther King, Jr. at the American Jewish Congress's May 1958 convention. That October, Prinz requested King's support to persuade President Dwight Eisenhower to convene a conference on integration at the White House. Weeks before, a Jewish temple was firebombed in Atlanta, Georgia. In early 1963, Prinz invited King to give a lecture at his synagogue attended by an overflow crowd, several months before the March on Washington for Jobs and Freedom.

During his tenure as president of the American Jewish Congress, Prinz sought to position the AJC as one of the country's most prominent civil rights organizations. At the 1960 AJC Convention, Prinz called for the Jewish community to identify with and participate in the broader struggle for civil rights:

Leadership in the March on Washington
As president of the American Jewish Congress, Prinz represented the Jewish community at the August 28, 1963, March on Washington. He was one of ten speakers in the program. Immediately before Prinz came to the podium, gospel singer Mahalia Jackson performed a stirring spiritual. 

In his address, Prinz contented that, based on his experience as a rabbi in Nazi Germany after the rise of Hitler, in the face of discrimination, "the most urgent, the most disgraceful, the most shameful and the most tragic problem is silence." After Prinz spoke, Martin Luther King Jr. delivered his famous "I Have a Dream" speech. 

Prinz attended King's funeral following his assassination in April 1968.

Personal life
Prinz's first wife Lucie Horovitz died in 1931. Prinz married Hilde Goldschmidt in 1932. They had four children: Michael (born in Berlin); Jonathan and Deborah (both born in the United States);  and adopted another daughter, Jo Seelmann, who was Hilde’s cousin and a Holocaust survivor.

Prinz died of a heart attack at St. Barnabas Hospital in Livingston, New Jersey in 1988. He was buried in the B'nai Abraham Memorial Park.

Works
  ("On the concept of religious experience") - Breslau 1927
  ("Biblical heroes and adventures") - Berlin-Charlottenburg: P. Baumann 1930
  ("Jewish history") - Berlin: Verlag für Kulturpolitik 1931 (2. Auflage: Illustrierte jüdische Geschichte. Berlin: Brandus 1933)
  ("We Jews") Berlin: Reiss 1934 (Excerpts in: Christoph Schulte,  ("Germanness and Jewishness.  A dispute among Jews in Germany") - Stuttgart: Reclam 1993, Reclams Universal-Bibliothek; Nr. 8899)
  ("Bible stories") - Berlin: Reiss Verl. 1934 (7 editions to 1937, new edition: New York: Atheneum Jewish publisher in 1988)
  ("The Friday evening") - Berlin: Brandus [1935]; Nachdruck: Zürich: Verl. Jüd. Buch-Gemeinde 1954
  ("The kingdoms of Israel and Judah") - Berlin: Reiss 1936
  ("Life in the ghetto") - Berlin: Löwe 1937
 Prayers for the High Holidays, 1951.
 The Dilemma of the Modern Jew, Boston: Little, Brown, 1962.
 Popes from the ghetto: a view of medieval Christendom, New York: Horizon Press, 1966.
 The secret Jews, New York: Random House, 1973.
  Joachim Prinz, Rebellious Rabbi: An Autobiography: the German and early American years,(ed. Michael A. Meyer) Indiana University Press, 2008

References and citations

Further reading
David Suissa "Before King, it was Prinz", Jewish Journal  4 September 2008

External links
 Memorial website for Joachim Prinz
 Speech on March on Washington

1902 births
1988 deaths
American activists
American Jewish Congress
American Zionists
American Conservative rabbis
Conservative Zionist rabbis
20th-century German rabbis
University of Giessen alumni
Zionist activists
Jewish peace activists
Silesian Jews
American people of German-Jewish descent
American people of Silesian descent
Jewish emigrants from Nazi Germany to the United States
People from the Province of Upper Silesia
People from the Province of Silesia
People from the Kingdom of Saxony
People from Opole County
Activists for African-American civil rights
20th-century American rabbis